Albone Glacier is a deeply entrenched narrow glacier on the east side of Wolseley Buttress flowing southward from Detroit Plateau on Nordenskjöld Coast in Graham Land, Antarctica.

History
Albone Glacier was mapped by the Falkland Islands Dependencies Survey from surveys (1960–61) and was named by the United Kingdom Antarctic Place-Names Committee for Dan Albone, English designer of the Ivel tractor, the first successful tractor with an internal combustion engine.

See also
 List of glaciers in the Antarctic
 Glaciology

References
 SCAR Composite Antarctic Gazetteer.
 

Glaciers of Nordenskjöld Coast